Kongju National University (KNU) is a university located in Chungcheongnam-do, South Korea with three campuses in Gongju, Cheonan and Yesan. Kongju National University is one of the leading national research universities of South Korea, especially in the field of education. Kongju National University is 2014 International Education Quality Assurance System (IEQAS) certified university.

History 
In 1948, Kongju College of Education was established to meet the needs of a growing nation, creating for itself a tradition and history. Kongju National University(KNU) began to develop the distinctive TRI-CAMPUS facilities in the Gongju, Yesan, and Cheonan areas, which include seven separate colleges for undergraduate and graduate students, and special graduate school opportunities. KNU is the only national university near the new public administration complex city, Sejong. Therefore, KNU has unlimited visions for growth as the core university of the new public administration city in the 21st century Korea. KNU has 22,000 students, which includes international students from 39 different countries.

Campuses
Gongju Campus (Main Campus)
56 Gongjudaehak-ro, Gongju-si, Chungcheongnam-do, Republic of Korea
Cheonan Campus (College of Engineering)
1223-254 Cheonan-daero, Seobuk-gu, Cheonan-si, Chungcheongnam-do, Republic of Korea
Yesan Campus (College of Industrial Sciences)
54 Daehak-ro, Yesan-gun, Yesan-eup, Chungcheongnam-do, Republic of Korea

Colleges and departments

College of Education
The College of Education has inherited 60 years long of tradition from the Kongju National Teachers College, established in 1948. From starting off with 3 departments (Korean Literature, Mathematics, and Housekeeping) and 136 students, Kongju National University College
of Education now have 22 departments with 122 professors and about 3,000 students. It is the largest among all National Teachers Colleges in South Korea.

Korean Education/ Sino-Korean Classics Education/ English Education/ Ethics Education/ Education/ Business Information Education/ Library and Information Science Education/ Special Education/ History Education/ Social Studies Education/ Geography Education/ Early Childhood Education/ Mathematics Education/ Physics Education/ Chemistry Education/ Biology Education/ Earth Science Education/ Environmental Education/ Computer Education/
Technology and Home Economics Education/ Physical Education/ Music Education/ Art Education

College of Humanities & Social Sciences
The College of Humanities and Social Sciences was established in 1991, when Kongju National University was accredited as a comprehensive university from the Kongju National Teachers College. It offers its courses in two divisions (majors), and department divisions (departments) and has three departments.

English Language and Literature/ Chinese Language and Literature/ French Language and Literature/ German Language and Literature/ History/ Geography/ Economics/ International Trade and Commerce/ Business Administration/ Tourism Administration/ Tourism English Interpretation/ Public Administration/ Law/ Social Welfare

College of Natural Sciences

Physics/ Applied Mathematics/ Chemistry/ Life Sciences/ Geo-Environmental Sciences/ Geography/ Atmospheric Sciences/ Cultural Heritage Conservation Sciences/ Fashion Design and Merchandising/ Life Sports Educators

College of Engineering
The College of Engineering of Kongju National University aims to produce capable engineering experts who will lead the industrial society of the future and who are ready to respond to the info-tech driven world. The College of Engineering was integrated with Cheonan National Technical College in March 2005, and its campus was relocated to Cheonan, opening a new chapter in the history of the College. The College operates 10 departments, 26 majors and two courses. The number of students exceeds 5,000, including graduate students, and more than 180 faculty members are dedicated to education and research in this large-scale college.

Electrical Engineering/ Control and Measurement Engineering/ Electronics Engineering-Nano and Information Engineering/ Radio Science Engineering/ Information and Communication Engineering/ Computer Engineering/ Multimedia Engineering/ Mechanical Engineering/ Mechanical Design Engineering/ Automotive Engineering/ Mechanical Engineering and System Design/ Civil and Environmental Engineering/ Urban and Transportation Engineering/ Architecture Design/ Architectural Engineering/ Chemical Engineering/ Industrial Chemistry/ Nano-Material Science and Engineering/ Polymer Science and Engineering/ Advanced Material Science and System Engineering/ Product Design/ Visual Information Design/ Environmental Engineering/ Industrial and Systems Engineering/ Optical Information Engineering/ Metallic Molding Design Engineering

College of Industrial Sciences
The College of Industrial Sciences is located in Yesan, in the central part of western Chungnam Province. There are various departments with an emphasis on agriculture, life sciences, and industrial sciences. The college has mutual research exchange programs with 22 colleges in 8 different countries.

Community Development/ Real Estate/ Industrial Channels Management/ Plant Resources/ Horticultural Science/ Animal Resources Science/ Rural Construction Engineering/ Bio-Industry Mechanical Engineering/ Forest Resources/ Landscape Architecture/ Food and Nutrition/ Food Service Management and Nutrition/ Food Science and Technology/ Companion and Laboratory Animal Science

College of Nursing & Health

Nursing/ Health Administration/ Emergency Medical Service/ Medical Information

College of Arts

Game Design/ Furniture Design/ Ceramic Design/ Jewelry Design/ Cartoon Comics/ Animation/ Dancing/ Media Image Art and Technology

Division of International Studies

DIS, established in 2011, admitted its first cohort of students in 2012. The Division draws on the strengths of economics, business, mathematics, statistics, and English while also being firmly rooted in globalization of the scholarly academy.

Division of Liberal Arts

Established in 2021

Campus life

Dormitory
The dormitories are in five buildings, and accommodate 4,365 students, including 2,773 students at Gongju Campus, 582 students at Yesan Campus and 234 students at Cheonan Campus. Foreign students are given priority for dormitory rooms upon acceptance.

Gongju Campus

Yesan Campus

Cheonan Campus

Campus clubs
Students join clubs to socialize and to meet other students who also enjoy the same hobbies.

Notable people
Yoon Mun-sik (actor)
 Baek Seung Tak (Chungcheongnam-do Province Superintendent of Education) the father of Baek Jong-won

See also
List of national universities in South Korea
List of universities and colleges in South Korea
Education in Korea

References

External links
 Website 
 Website

Gallery 

Gongju
National universities and colleges in South Korea
Universities and colleges in South Chungcheong Province
Educational institutions established in 1948
1948 establishments in Korea